Elbow Valley is a rural locality in the Southern Downs Region, Queensland, Australia. It is on the border of New South Wales.

History 
The locality presumably takes its name from the Elbow River, which was named by botanist and explorer Allan Cunningham in his field notes on 6 June 1827.

Elbow Valley Provisional School opened on 17 July 1882. On 1 January 1909, it became Elbow Valley State School. It closed in 1946. It was on O'Deas Road.

Westmore State School opened on 1916 and closed on 1923. It was a "tent school" and officially opened on 1 July 1916 by Francis Grayson, Member of the Queensland Legislative Assembly for Cunningham, with food provided by the cheese factory. In June 1927, the Queensland Government called for tenders to remove the school building.

Education 
There are no schools in Elbow Valley. The nearest government primary schools are Murrays Bridge State School in neighbouring Murrays Bridge to the north, Killarney State School in neighbouring Killarney to the north-east, and Dalveen State School in neighbouring Dalveen to the south-west. The nearest government secondary schools are Killarney State School (to Year 10), Warwick State High School (to Year 12) in Warwick to the north, and Stanthorpe State High School (to Year 12) in Stanthorpe to the south-west.

References

Further reading 

 

Southern Downs Region
Localities in Queensland